Peter Charles David (born 1957) is a Grenadian politician.  He is the Deputy General Secretary of the New National Party (NNP), (Grenada), a member of the House of Representatives from the Town of Saint George constituency, and served as Minister of Foreign Affairs from July 2008 to November 2010. He subsequently served as Minister of Tourism until he resigned from the Cabinet on April 30, 2012.

Political career
David was elected to the House of Representatives as an NDC candidate from the Town of St. Georges in the November 2003 general election. The New National Party (NNP), the governing party, repeatedly went to court in attempts to prevent David from serving in Parliament, arguing that he is a citizen of Canada and thus ineligible, but these legal efforts by the NNP were rejected.

In the general election held on July 8, 2008, David was re-elected from the Town of St. George. The NDC won a majority of seats in this election, and David became Minister of Tourism and Foreign Affairs in the new NDC Cabinet, led by Prime Minister Tillman Thomas, which was sworn in on July 13.

References

1957 births
Living people
Foreign ministers of Grenada
Grenadian people of Indian descent
Members of the House of Representatives of Grenada
Government ministers of Grenada
National Democratic Congress (Grenada) politicians
People from Saint George Parish, Grenada
21st-century Grenadian politicians